Actes et Paroles (words and deeds) is a collection of Victor Hugo's political utterances from 1841 to 1876. It contains his speeches, largely unchanged, and a record of his political career.

History
This collection of texts was published after the return to France of Hugo, who had gone into exile after Napoleon III coup d'état of December 2, 1851. It is divided into three volumes:

 Avant l'exil, 1841-1851 (before the exile)
 Pendant l'exil, 1852-1870 (during the exile)
 Depuis l'exil, 1870-1876 (since the exile)

References

External links

Link to ebook

Works by Victor Hugo
1875 non-fiction books